La Trampa was an Uruguayan rock band. It was conformed by Garo Arakelián (guitar), Alejandro Spuntone (vocals), Irvin Carballo (drums) and Carlos Ráfols (bass).

The early years 

La Trampa appeared in scene in 1991 being conformed since winter 1990 by the first two members, architecture students Garo Arakelián and Sergio Schellemberg. In those times the band was formed only by classmates of Garo and Sergio (Martín Rosas 'vocalist', Nicolás Rodríguez 'drums' and Gabriel Francia 'bass').

After a year of work (with Garo and Sergio composing almost every song and all the band rehearsing), La Trampa appeared for the first time on stage, that was on May 3, 1991, in El Tinglado theater (in companion of Cadáveres Ilustres, another Uruguayan band), in those times, the band's manager was Aldo Silva.

Reaching a Uruguayan identity was, since the beginning, one of the goals the band had. "We planned on reaching a well recognizable Uruguayan sound, provided by some urban music aspects with folk features… The sound was fundamental, along with the lyrics that should generate our own 'cosmogony'… build our own world, formed by some fantasy and some of our experiences from life, that was, basically, the intention", said, some years ago, Garo. "Since the beginning, we didn't want to take ourselves apart from the fact of being Uruguayan, (…) but assume it, with courage and proud, as something that was far enough to generate a good artistic product" he added.

In August 1991, they recorded a demo recorded in La Batuta records. It contained four songs: “Arma de doble filo” (a rock version of Gaston ´Dino´Ciarlo's song), “Vals”, “Besos y silencios” and “Madre de flores” (an unedited song). By this way, some of those songs started being emitted in radio, in times where Uruguayan people were not interested in the local rock.

First changes 

A little time later Nicolás Rodríguez left the band and Daniel “Chino” González took his place, taking charge of the drums for the following years.

In 1993 Martín Rosas also left the band and Alejandro Spuntone [who nowadays is the lead singer], took his place. After a few rehearsals with Spuntone, Gabriel Francia announced that he was leaving the band, so a substitute was needed. Therefore, Sergio Schellemberg got in touch with Carlos Ráfols (ADN's ex bassist), to take the open spot in the band. Schellemberg had already invited him when the band was just a project, but he was not seduced by the idea. The second time, and due to a stronger insistence of Sergio, Rafols took part in the band.

The new staff came in scene along with El Cuarteto de Nos, on Friday May 7, 1993, inside the building of the Architecture University (Facultad de Arquitectura) .

Early works 

In May 1994 the band started recording "Toca y Obliga" at Estudio Records, the band's first studio album, released by Orfeo in January 1995. The first thousand of discs sold out making it almost impossible to get it until 2005 when Bizarro Records and EMI Music re-edited it.

It took three years of hard work for them to get to record their first album, three years composing, rehearsing and playing live, learning all on stage, even carrying their own instruments and equipment. Three years before getting to talk to Orfeo's Alfonso Carbone who really helped them in the process of recording "Toca y Obliga" This was perhaps the band's most produced album.

Despite being a Rock album, there was a lot of Milonga and some Tango given by the sounds of the Bandoneon played by Edison Bordon.

The album was very well taken by both the critics and public, so it got more attention from the radios who started broadcasting it more frequently. "Dulces Tormentos" was one of the most spread songs of the album.

It was also in 1995 that Daniel "Chino" Gonzalez left the band taking his place for over one year Javier "Pichu" Villanustre, who got to record "En la noche" a cover of Los Estomagos that was included in "Extrañas Visiones" a tribute album to the band along with some other well known performers such as El Peyote Asesino, Claudio Taddei, Los Traidores, The Supersonicos, Eduardo Darnauchans and more.

"Calaveras" and scene recognition

That December they stopped performing live in order to start composing for what would be their second studio album called Calaveras ("Skulls"), but they had already gone through another change when 'Pichu' Villanustre left the band without someone to take care of drums.

At that time, they were rehearsing at Elepé, Álvaro "Alvin" Pintos's studio. Facing the time to record a new album, and without a drummer they asked Alvin, who at that time already was El Cuarteto de Nos drummer to learn and make all the rhythmic arrangements to all the new songs in just one week.

The album got finished in 1997, a very important year for the band that having recorded their second album that wasn't at stores yet, the band played at 'Rock de aca' a very important concert where they were named by both the press and public as one of the best bands to perform there. Even as they played most songs from an album that no one had ever heard of because it wasn't finished yet.

It was in October that 'Ayui records' released the album, that in just one month sold out its first edition.

Calaveras still has its folk influences, but on the contrary to 'Toca y obliga' where that was shown with the music of the bandoneon now it was the drums that took care of those features with rhythms varying from chacarera and malambo to plain rock and roll, but still the milonga and tango were present in their compositions.

´Calaveras' was awarded as 'best album of the year 1997' by X FM's staff and public.

The Resurrection

The 1999 released album "Resurreccion" was a more mature work and a great experience for the band who recorded the album in Argentina. It sounds louder and treats topics like the human being and the world that we live in, a real resurrection for the new millennia. The number of fans of the band grew, and by 2001 La Trampa sold out in well-known performing centers like Teatro de Verano and Plaza Mateo.

By 2001 Sergio Schellemberg left the band, leaving them without keyboard, an instrument that accompanied the band since their foundation.

Desencanto

On 2008, after a long retreat from the stages, La Trampa had a change in their line-up as Alvaro "Alvin" Pintos left to be a full-time member of El Cuarteto De Nos. He was replaced by Irvin Carballo, and not only their formation changed but also their signature sound. Fans reckon this change in sound as a sell-out since the band approached a more mature and in a way  "pop" sound.

That year they released El Mísero Espiral De Encanto.

Discography
Toca y Obliga (1994)

Track list

 Nada pasa y todo queda
 Dulces Tormentos
 Vientos del Sur
 Besos y Silencios
 Cancion del Parque
 El Grito del Diamante
 Del Adiós
 Arma de Doble Filo
 Requiem
 Por Verte Feliz
 Aunque Lloren los Muchachos
 1973 Milonga Mar

Calaveras (1997)

Track list

 Calaveras
 Carne
 Yo Se Quien Soy
 Mar de Fondo
 Las Cruces del Corazón
 Buena Droga
 Soledad
 Los Patios del Alma
 Los Días de Milagro
 Frenta a Frente
 Vals
 Pensar y Separar

Resurrección (1999)

Track list

 Guerra en Todas Partes
 Maldición
 Vendas en el Corazón
 Contrapiso para el Alma
 El Cielo Frente a Mi
 ¿A dónde vas?
 Peligro
 La Claridad
 Canción 2000
 Ahuyentando el Miedo
 Tus Mentiras
 Resurrección
 
Caída Libre (2002)

Track list

 Santa Rosa
 Caída Libre
 Los Sueños
 Cruz Diablo
 Muere con la Sonrisa
 Luna de Marzo
 El Oro y la Maldad
 Muerte Serena
 Mi Pobre Final
 La Mordida
 Perdidos en Montevideo
 Si Te Vas

Frente a Frente (Live at Talleres de Don Bosco) (2003)

Track list
 
 Las Cruces del Corazón.
 Calaveras
 Muerte Serena
 De Nosotros Dos
 Vendas en el Corazón
 Contrapiso Para el Alma
 Arma de Doble Filo
 1973 Milonga Mar
 Luna de Marzo
 Dulces Tormentos
 Por Verte Feliz
 Peligro
 El Oro y la Maldad
 De Despedida
 Nada Pasa y Todo Queda
 Caída Libre
 Mar de Fondo
 Yo Se Quien Soy

Laberinto (2005)

Track list

 Puente de Estrellas
 Las Décimas
 El Poeta Dice la Verdad
 Ronda de Lenguas
 Canciones al Viento
 Gajo de Luz
 Sin Piel
 Araucaria
 Pensares
 Alta Mar
 Los Ojos de Mariam
 Vagos Recuerdos

El Mísero Espiral De Encanto (2008)

Track list

 Simple
 Para El Día Después
 Irreversible
 Clavel del Aire
 Desencanto
 Cristal
 Shangrilá
 La Casa Azul
 Todo Me Golpea
 Cuando Aquieten tus Heridas
 Escaparte al Mundo
 Espuma al Viento

Uruguayan musicians